Bankə (also, Bank, Banka, Bankov, Imeni Kirova and Rybokombinat Imeni Kirova) is a village and the most populous municipality, except for the capital Neftçala, in the Neftchala Rayon of Azerbaijan.  It has a population of 7,574.

Etymology
The city's name comes from Azerbaijani version of fishing bank.

References

External links
 
 

Populated places in Neftchala District